Throughout the history of Knowing Bros, this segments is shown on both TV and YouTube, after the end of a Knowing Bros episodes.

Job consultation room
An official corner of the show after the Brother School segment for the episode has ended. Jang Sung-kyu, Shindong and Jeong Se-woon would let guests (different from in Brother School), as Variety Job Lookers, to prove their variety skills to the three.

MC
Jang Sung-kyu
Shindong
Jeong Se-woon

Episodes

After school activities: Dong Dong Shin Ki
Kang Ho-dong, together with Shindong (Super Junior), visits various idols and learn idol songs choreographs. Several other guests will then watch the final dancing videos and comment on them. This activity lasted from July 11 to October 24, 2020.

Cast
Kang Ho-dong
Shindong

Episodes

After school activities: Universe hipsters
Universe Cowards (Kim Hee-chul, Min Kyung-hoon) visit rappers and learn hip hop and rapping from them. This activity began from October 31, 2020 to January 2, 2021.

Through this activity, Kim Hee-chul and Min Kyung-hoon have released a new hip hop single "Hanryang" (한량), which is produced by DinDin and features BIBI. The single was released on December 20 at 00:00 (KST).

As a fulfillment of their promise for the "Hanryang" (한량) music video reaching 1 million views in 24 hours, Universe Cowards held an online fan-meet on January 14, 2021 with special guests DinDin, BIBI, and Ateez.

Cast
Kim Hee-chul
Min Kyung-hoon

Episodes

After school activities: Lots of advice
Seo Jang-hoon and Lee Soo-geun, a duo in Brother School that is well-known for their chemistry, get advice on various games, alongside Shindong (Super Junior). This activity began from January 16 to April 17, 2021.

Cast
Seo Jang-hoon
Lee Soo-geun
Shindong (Super Junior)

Episodes

See also
 List of Knowing Bros episodes

References

Knowing Bros